Forty-Seven Days: How Pershing's Warriors Came of Age to Defeat the German Army in World War I is a book by Mitchell Yockelson and published by NAL Caliber/New American Library about the Battles of the Meuse-Argonne.

Critical response
The Washington Independent Review of Books described it as a "must read" and a general introduction to the United States' involvement in World War I.

Kirkus Reviews described it as "accessible, elucidating study by a knowledgeable expert."

References

2016 non-fiction books
World War I books
New American Library books